Color Me Country is a studio album by American country music artist Linda Martell. It was released in August 1970 via Plantation Records and was produced by Shelby Singleton. The album contained three charting singles by Martell, including her cover of "Color Him Father." The album also reached a charting position following its original release. Color Me Country was the only album released in Martell's music career. It has since been reissued in several formats and has received positive reviews since its original release date.

Background and content
Linda Martell was one of country music's first commercially successful black performers. She was also the first black female performer to sing at the Grand Ole Opry. Originally, Martell made an unsuccessful attempt as an R&B performer in the early 1960s. In the latter half of the decade, she met William "Duke" Rayner, who believed in her potential for a career in country music. Through a meeting with producer Shelby Singleton, Martell signed a recording contract with Plantation Records in May 1969 and began recording her first album thereafter. Under the production of Singleton, Color Me Country was recorded in 1969 at Singleton Sound Studios, located in Nashville, Tennessee. All of the album's tracks were cut in a single work day that altogether took 12 hours to complete.

The album contained a total of eleven tracks. Its final track, "Before the Next Teardrop Falls," was a cover that would later be made most commercially successful by Freddy Fender. that would On the opening track, "Bad Case of the Blues," Martell can be heard yodeling. Meanwhile, other tracks, such as "I Almost Called Your Name," were cut in a ballad style. According to Rolling Stone, Singleton told Martell what songs to record and how to record them. He had obtained a copy of The Winstons' pop hit, "Color Him Father," and told Martell to record it

Critical reception

Color Me Country received positive reviews from music critics and journalists following its release. It was first reviewed in September 1970 by Billboard magazine, who called Martell "the female Charley Pride." Writers also found that she had a musical style that fit country music and they highlighted the tracks, "Color Him Father," "Bad Case of the Blues" and "The Wedding Cake."

In later years, the album received three and a half stars from Mark Deming of Allmusic. Deming found her to be a country performer who seemed to have never reached her full potential: "Color Me Country makes it clear that wasn't because of a lack of talent, and this is a fascinating and entertaining curio from a forgotten country music pioneer," he concluded. David Browne of Rolling Stone called the album's production to be "lean and spunky, making her sound like the equal of Loretta Lynn or Tammy Wynette."

Release and chart performance
Color Me Country was released in August 1970 on Plantation Records. It was Martell's first and only studio release in her music career. It was originally issued as a vinyl LP, containing five songs on "side A" and six songs on "side B." In 2014, the album was reissued as a compact disc collection via Real Gone Music. It was later reissued to digital and streaming services in the 2010s, including Apple Music. Following its initial release, Color Me Country spent two weeks on the Billboard Top Country Albums chart, peaking at number 40 in October 1970.

Three singles were spawned from Color Me Country. Its first single was Martell's cover of "Color Him Father," which was issued as a single in July 1969. The single spent ten weeks on the Billboard Hot Country Songs chart and peaked at number 22 on the list in September 1969. It was Martell's highest-charting single release on the country songs chart. In November 1969, Martell's cover of "Before the Next Teardrop Falls" was issued as the record's second single. The song spent eight weeks on the Billboard country chart and peaked at number 33 in January 1970. "Bad Case of the Blues" was issued as the third single in February 1970. Spending six weeks on the country chart, it peaked at number 58 two months later. It was also Martell's last charting single. A fourth single was released from the LP titled "You're Crying Boy, Crying." Issued in November 1970, the single did not chart.

Track listing

Vinyl version

Compact disc and digital versions

Personnel
All credits are adapted from Allmusic and are from the 2014 version Color Me Country.

Musical and technical personnel
 Gordon Anderson – Reissue producer
 Bill Dahl – Liner notes
 Tom Kline – Reissue design
 Linda Martell – Lead vocals
 Mike Milchner – Remastering
 Shelby Singleton – Producer
 Joe Venneri – Engineer

Chart performance

Release history

References

1970 debut albums
Albums produced by Shelby Singleton
Plantation Records albums